Pulchellodromus is a genus of running crab spiders that was first separated from Philodromus by J. Wunderlich in 2012.

Species
 it contains thirteen species, found in Africa, Europe, and Asia:
Pulchellodromus afroglaucinus (Muster & Bosmans, 2007) – Algeria
Pulchellodromus bistigma (Simon, 1870) – Mediterranean
Pulchellodromus glaucinus (Simon, 1870) – Mediterranean
Pulchellodromus lamellipalpis (Muster, 2007) – Algeria
Pulchellodromus mainlingensis (Hu & Li, 1987) – Tibet
Pulchellodromus medius (O. Pickard-Cambridge, 1872) – Italy, Greece, Turkey, Ukraine, Caucasus (Russia, Azerbaijan), Iran
Pulchellodromus navarrus Kastrygina, Kovblyuk & Polchaninova, 2016 – Spain
Pulchellodromus pardalis (Muster & Bosmans, 2007) – Portugal, Spain, Algeria to Egypt
Pulchellodromus pulchellus (Lucas, 1846) (type) – Mediterranean
Pulchellodromus punctiger (O. Pickard-Cambridge, 1908) – Canary Is., Spain
Pulchellodromus ruficapillus (Simon, 1885) – Mediterranean to Kazakhstan
Pulchellodromus simoni (Mello-Leitão, 1929) – Portugal, Spain, Algeria
Pulchellodromus wunderlichi (Muster & Thaler, 2007) – Canary Is.

In synonymy:
P. glaucinoides (Wunderlich, 1987) = Pulchellodromus punctiger (O. Pickard-Cambridge, 1908)
P. glaucinus (Strand, 1913) = Pulchellodromus pulchellus (Lucas, 1846)
P. marionschmidti (Schmidt, 1990) = Pulchellodromus pulchellus (Lucas, 1846)
P. salinarum (Denis, 1939) = Pulchellodromus glaucinus (Simon, 1870)
P. torquatus (O. Pickard-Cambridge, 1873) = Pulchellodromus pulchellus (Lucas, 1846)

See also
 List of Philodromidae species

References

Araneomorphae genera
Philodromidae
Spiders of Africa
Spiders of Asia